The Spathario Shadow Theatre Museum is a museum in Maroussi, Athens, Greece. It exhibits mostly shadow puppet artifacts and it is named after prominent Greek puppet shadow artist Evgenios Spatharis. It was established in 1991 in the municipality of Maroussi and opened in 1996.

See also
Karagiozis

References

External links
Official website
Hellenic Ministry of Culture and Tourism
City of Athens
Municipality of Maroussi (in Greek)

Museums in Athens
Puppet museums
Buildings and structures in North Athens
Marousi
Shadow play